Lady in White may refer to:

 Lady in White, a 1988 American horror movie
 The Lady in White, a 1938 Italian comedy movie
 The Lady in White (film), a 1962 Swedish mystery film
 Lady in White (Toorop), an 1886 painting
 Lady in White (Bracquemond), an 1880 painting
 "The Lady in White" (American Horror Story), an episode of the TV series
 The Lady in White (Perla Siedle Gibson), a singer in Durban during World War II

See also
 Ladies in White, a Cuban opposition movement
 White Lady (disambiguation)
 The Woman in White (disambiguation)